Penny James (born 1969) is a British businesswoman who was the chief executive of Direct Line Group from May 2019 to January 2023.

Career
James worked at Omega Insurance and Zurich before joining Prudential Plc, where her roles have included chief risk officer. She also served as a non-executive director of Admiral Group between 2015 and 2017.

In 2017, she left Prudential to join the Direct Line Group as chief financial officer. At the time, she was the only woman on the executive committee of DLG. In May 2019, James succeeded Paul Geddes as CEO of Direct Line Group. In January 2023, she stepped down and was succeeded by the chief commercial officer Jonathan Greenwood as acting chief executive.

References

1969 births
Alumni of the University of Bath
British women chief executives
Direct Line Group
Living people
People educated at Millfield
PricewaterhouseCoopers people
Prudential plc people